Mücahit Can Akçay (born 13 April 1998) is a Turkish professional footballer who plays as a forward for Ankara Demirspor.

Professional career
A youth product of Gençlerbirliği, Akçay signed with Konyaspor in 2016 and made his debut for them in a 1-0 Turkish Cup loss to Trabzonspor on 26 January 2017. Akçay was loaned to Anadolu Selçukspor for the 2017-18 season in the TFF Second League, and finished as one of the top scorers in the league.

International career
Akçay is a youth international for Turkey. He represented the Turkey U20s at the 2018 Toulon Tournament, and scored a brace in his debut - a 2-1 win over the Japan U20s on 28 May 2018.

Honours

Club
Konyaspor
Turkish Cup (1): 2016-17

References

External links
 
 
 

1998 births
Living people
Footballers from Istanbul
Turkish footballers
Turkey youth international footballers
Konyaspor footballers
Ümraniyespor footballers
MKE Ankaragücü footballers
1461 Trabzon footballers
Ankara Demirspor footballers
Süper Lig players
TFF First League players
TFF Second League players
Association football forwards